Magali Thiébaut (born 11 May 1976) is a French female canoeist who won eleven medals at individual senior level of the Wildwater Canoeing World Championships and European Wildwater Championships.

References

External links
 Magali Thiébaut at FFCK

1976 births
Living people
French female canoeists
Place of birth missing (living people)